Professional Distributor magazine is an automotive aftermarket magazine for mobile tool and equipment jobbers and tool and equipment warehouse distributors. The magazine has a circulation of approximately 15,000 automotive repair professionals.

Overview
Professional Distributor is based in Fort Atkinson, Wisconsin. The magazine covers new tools and equipment in auto repair, sales tips for jobbers, IT help and more. It is issued 10 times per year. The magazine was part of Cygnus Business Media. The company sold the magazine and others to SouthComm, Inc., a publishing and communications company, based in Nashville in November 2014. In 2018, Southcomm sold its trade publications to Endeavor Business Media.

References

External links
Professional Distributor Magazine Website
The Top Portable Air Compressors For Jeep

Automobile magazines published in the United States
Business magazines published in the United States
Magazines established in 1990
Magazines published in Wisconsin
Professional and trade magazines